The 1913 Georgia Tech Yellow Jackets football team represented the Georgia Institute of Technology during the 1913 Southern Intercollegiate Athletic Association football season. This was the first season the team played at Grant Field.

Schedule

References

Georgia Tech
Georgia Tech Yellow Jackets football seasons
Georgia Tech Yellow Jackets football